Numerous police and international intelligence agencies classify the Hells Angels Motorcycle Club (HAMC) as a motorcycle gang and contend that members carry out widespread violent crimes, including drug dealing, trafficking in stolen goods, gunrunning, extortion, and prostitution operations. Members of the organization have continuously asserted that they are only a group of motorcycle enthusiasts who have joined to ride motorcycles together, to organize social events such as group road trips, fundraisers, parties, and motorcycle rallies, and that any crimes are the responsibility of the individuals who carried them out and not the club as a whole. Members of the club have been accused of crimes and/or convicted in many host nations.

Argentina

The Argentine branch of the HAMC was established with a charter in Buenos Aires on 16 June 1999.

American Hells Angels member Paul Merle Eischeid, who fled the United States in 2007 after being charged with drug trafficking, racketeering, kidnapping and homicide, was apprehended in San Isidro, Buenos Aires on 3 February 2011 after being tracked by the U.S. Marshal Service, Diplomatic Security Service, and Interpol. Eischeid, along with fellow Hells Angels Kevin J. Augustiniak and Michael Christopher "Mesa Mike" Kramer, had murdered Yvonne Garcia, a 44-year-old mother of six who verbally disrespected the club and its members while in an intoxicated state during a party at the Hells Angels' clubhouse in Mesa, Arizona on 27 October 2001. He was extradited to the U.S. in July 2018 after exhausting all of his appeals in the Argentine legal system.

On 14 May 2016, three people were seriously injured as a result of a shootout between the Hells Angels and Los Tehuelches, a rival motorcycle gang with Neo-Nazi sympathies consisting primarily of active and former police officers, at a highway gas station in Luján, Buenos Aires. Two men – Los Tehuelches leader Leo Gatto, and Hells Angels president Daniel "Dani La Muerte" Díaz León, a celebrity bodyguard and television personality – were shot several times, while a woman was run over. The rival clubs were reportedly travelling to a motorcycle rally in Trenque Lauquen when members of Los Tehuelches opened fire on the Hells Angels from a van, prompting a gun battle in which around 150 rounds were fired. Ten people, including Díaz León and Gatto, were arrested and firearms were seized.

Australia

The Hells Angels expanded to Australia in 1975, initially establishing chapters in Melbourne and Sydney, and now have approximately two-hundred-and-fifty members and fourteen chapters in the country.

The club's activities in Australia have traditionally included drug trafficking, prostitution, armed robbery, arms trafficking, fencing stolen goods and murder-for-hire, but they have more recently moved into legitimate businesses such as gyms, tattoo parlours, haulage companies, and the security industry. Police allege that the Hells Angels undertake money laundering by passing money through legitimate businesses.

Belgium
Belgium became home to its first Hells Angels chapter in the summer of 1997, at which time a major Belgian police inquiry into the club immediately began. In May 1999, Belgium became the first country in the world to declare the Hells Angels an illegal organization with Vincent hallez. A court in Ghent ruled that the motorcycle club amounts to a private militia – membership of which is banned under Belgian law.

On October 4, 2009, several Hells Angels and allied Red Devils performed a raid on an Outlaws clubhouse in Kortrijk. Shots were fired and three Outlaws were wounded before the Hells Angels and their Red Devils comrades fled the scene. The incident occurred after members of the Outlaws supposedly pushed over a motorcycle belonging to Red Devils president Johan F. in Moeskroen. The raid is also thought to be a part of a territorial dispute between the Hells Angels and the Red Devils on one side and the Outlaws on the other. Several months before the raid, on July 24, 2009, members of the Red Devils and Hells Angels already retaliated by setting fire to motorcycles outside an Outlaws clubhouse. Eventually six Hells Angels and two Red Devils were convicted for attempted murder and given sentences from five to twenty years in prison.

Hells Angels member Ali Ipekci shot dead Outlaws member Freddy Put, hangaround Jef Banken and supporter Michael Gerekens in an industrial zone in Maasmechelen where the Outlaws were holding an opening reception for a new tire centre on May 20, 2011. He was convicted of triple murder and sentenced to 30 years' imprisonment on February 6, 2015.

In October 2014, 47-year-old British man Conrad Toland was arrested by Spanish police in Madrid and brought before the National Court in Madrid to face extradition proceedings to Belgium where he was wanted to complete a 10-year sentence for smuggling 155 kilograms of cocaine into the country from Ecuador in July 2011 inside a tuna shipment. He then supplied the drugs to the Hells Angels chapter in Bruges. He also faced charges in Belgium of membership in an armed gang and money laundering.

Canada

The Criminal Intelligence Service Canada (CISC) has designated the Hells Angels an outlaw motorcycle gang. In 2002, Crown Prosecutor Graeme Williams sought to have the club formally declared a "criminal organization" by applying the anti-gang legislation (Bill C-24) to a criminal prosecution involving the Hells Angels and two of its members, Stephen "Tiger" Lindsay and Raymond "Razor" Bonner. The prosecution team launched a three-year investigation with the aim of collecting evidence for the trial. According to CBC News, the Hells Angels have thirty-four chapters operating in Canada with 1,260 full-fledged (patched) members. According to this article, the Hells Angels had at that time fifteen chapters in Ontario, eight in British Columbia, five in Quebec, three in Alberta, two in Saskatchewan and one in Manitoba.

Denmark

Formation and early rivalries 

Conflicts between youth gangs from the Copenhagen districts of Amager Vest, Amager Øst and Nørrebro started to occur in the early 1970s and by the late 1970s, the Galloping Goose, Nomads, Iron Sculls and Dirty Angels motorcycle clubs united as Unionen MC before applying for membership of the Hells Angels. The former Unionen officially became the first Scandinavian Hells Angels chapter on December 30, 1980, setting up chapters in Copenhagen's Titangade and Nørrebro districts. Shortly thereafter, the Filthy Few, an Amager-based club, merged with the Nøragersmindebanden to form Bullshit MC, settling in Freetown Christiania where they benefited from the trade in cannabis products and challenged the Hells Angels for control of Copenhagen's biker scene. The two clubs would wage war against each other between September 1983 and December 1985. The Copenhagen biker war began on September 24, 1983, when three Bullshit members and a woman entered the Søpromenaden restaurant, a known Hells Angels hangout, at Dag Hammerskjolds Alle 37. Two of the three Bullshit members, Søren Grabow Grander (November 25, 1962 – September 24, 1983) and Flemming Hald Jensen (April 4, 1962 – September 24, 1983) were killed in a bottle and knife attack. Hells Angels member Bent "Blondie" Svane Nielsen was convicted for the murders. In November 1983, Bullshit president Henning Norbert "Makrellen" Knudsen (January 15, 1960 – May 25, 1984) was interviewed on the live television show Mellem Mennesker ("Between Humans"), which aired on DR TV, and stated that he would not allow an American motorcycle club such as the Hells Angels to gain control in Denmark. Knudsen was shot and killed with a submachine gun in front of his wife Pia outside their home on May 25, 1984. At the time of his death, Knudsen and other Bullshit members were the prime suspects for the double murder of two young men (aged 16 and 20) in Amager six days before. A Yugoslavian immigrant would later be convicted of those murders, however. Three Hells Angels were convicted for their part in Knudsen's killing; Jens-Peter Kristensen was sentenced to twelve years in prison, and Christian Middelboe was sentenced to seven years, both for aiding Jørn "Jønke" Nielsen who carried out the shooting. Nielsen fled to Canada but was apprehended and extradited back to Denmark in 1989 where he served sixteen years in prison for the murder.

The following two Bullshit presidents after Knudsen were also assassinated. Palle "Lillebror" Blåbjerg (July 26, 1959 – April 26, 1985) was shot dead at work; while delivering beers to an off-licence store in Valby Langgade on April 26, 1985, Carsten Bresløv (born June 9, 1958), a member of the Morticians who were a club affiliated with the Hells Angels at the time, entered the store wearing a mask and shot Blåbjerg. In court, Bresløv claimed to have no regrets whatsoever, apart from not having killed Blåbjerg's working colleague as well. Anker Walther "Høvding" Marcus (January 17, 1947 – December 21, 1985) was then murdered by Ole Bonnesen Nielsen and Rene Nøddeskov Ludvigsen, two members of the Black Sheep (another Hells Angels prospect club), following a Christmas party at Nemoland Café in Christiania on December 21, 1985. Lars Michael Larsen (October 16, 1965 – December 21, 1985), an innocent bystander, was also killed in this attack after being shot in the mouth. Nielsen and Ludvigsen claimed that they had shot in self-defence after Marcus had drawn a handgun first.

Bullshit MC left Christiania following Marcus' death and formally disbanded in 1988. By the end of the Copenhagen biker war, eight Bullshit members had been killed compared to one Hells Angel, in addition to one "civilian" which brought the total death toll to ten during the 2-year-four-month-long conflict. The Black Sheep later "patched-over" to (were absorbed by) the Hells Angels, while the Morticians were declined membership.

Nordic Biker War 
The Morticians, who were founded in 1984, became a rival club of the Hells Angels by 1992 before changing their name to Undertakers MC and later aligning themselves with the Bandidos, whose only European chapter was based in Marseille, France, at that point. In 1993, the Undertakers merged with the Bandidos to become Bandidos MC Denmark. In 1994, the Hells Angels tried to prevent another club, Morbids MC, from growing into an established biker gang and potential rival in Sweden. The Morbids then also joined an alliance with the Bandidos, who backed-up their prospect club. Outlaws MC also joined with the Bandidos in Norway. This eventually led to the Great Nordic Biker War, a conflict over control of the drug trade between the two most powerful outlaw biker gangs in Scandinavia, the Hells Angels and the Bandidos. After gang violence had already erupted in Finland, Norway and Sweden, the war reached Denmark on December 25, 1995, when two Hells Angels members were beaten up by Bandidos at a nightclub in Copenhagen, signaling the beginning of a number of violent incidents between the clubs in the country.

Bandidos members who were returning from a weekend in Helsinki were shot, three wounded and one, Uffe Larsen, was killed at Copenhagen Airport on March 10, 1996. Six Hells Angels members and associates were convicted and sentenced to a total of 53 years in prison, and one was given a life sentence, for the attack. In April and May 1996, the clubhouse of a Hells Angels prospect club, Avengers MC, was attacked in Aalborg. On October 6, 1996, an anti-tank rocket was fired at a Hells Angels clubhouse in Copenhagen during a party. Hells Angels member Louis Linde Nielsen and guest Janne Krohn were both killed. Bandidos prospect Niels Poulsen was convicted of carrying out the attacks and sentenced to life in prison. Towards the end of 1996, there were shootings of Bandidos members in Horsens and Aalborg.

At the beginning of 1997, Hells Angels member Kim Thrysöe Svendsen was murdered in Aalborg. Outlaws president Thore "Henki" Holm and a French Outlaws member were subsequently shot and wounded by a member of the Untouchables MC, a Hells Angels ally. Bandidos foot-soldiers were also shot in Amager and Køge. The Bandidos responded by ordering shootings on Hells Angels members and allies in Frederiksberg, Copenhagen. Björn Gudmandsen was then killed and three other Bandidos were wounded after a shooting in Liseleje on June 7, 1997. Hells Angels member Vagn Smith was convicted of the murder and sentenced to life imprisonment. The last incident happened on August 11, 1997, when the Bandidos clubhouse in Dalby was bombed.

The war ended on September 25, 1997, as "Big" Jim Tinndahn, the president of the Bandidos' European chapters, and Hells Angels Europe president Bent "Blondie" Svane Nielsen announced that they had signed a peace agreement and shook hands in front of Danish TV news cameras. By the end of the war, 11 murders and 74 attempted murders had been committed and 96 people were wounded across Scandinavia. A law was passed in Denmark that banned motorcycle clubs from owning or renting property for their club activities. The law has subsequently been repealed on constitutional grounds.

Later incidents 
Bandidos associate Flemming Jensen was beaten and stabbed to death by Hells Angels members in a tavern in Aalborg on August 12, 2001. Hells Angels prospect Jesper Østenkær Kristoffersen confessed to stabbing Jensen eight times and was sentenced to six years in prison for manslaughter on February 7, 2002, while Jørn "Jønke" Nielsen was sentenced to four years on September 18, 2002, for aggravated assault resulting in death as witnesses claimed that he had kicked and stomped on Jensen.

In 2007, a Hells Angels-associated gang named Altid Klar-81 ("Altid Klar" is Danish for "Always Ready" and 81 is synonymous with the letters HA) was formed in Denmark to combat immigrant street gangs in a feud over the lucrative illegal hash market. AK81 has been recruiting much quicker than the mainstream Hells Angels as members are not required to own a motorcycle or wear a patch, and racial tensions are running high in parts of Denmark. On August 14, 2008, Osman Nuri Dogan, a 19-year-old Turk, was shot and killed by an AK81 member in Tingbjerg. Later that year, on October 8, there was a shoot-out between AK81 members and a group of immigrants in Nørrebro, Copenhagen, during which one man was injured.

Germany

Formation and early years  
The first German charter of the Hells Angels was founded in Hamburg via a "patch over" of the Bloody Devils biker gang in March 1973, and was active in the red-light districts of St. Pauli and Sternschanze. The club consists of 69 chapters and 1,400 members in Germany.

In 1980, Hells Angels members murdered a nightclub manager on the island of Sylt. On August 11, 1983, 500 police officers stormed the clubhouse "Angels Place" in the red-light district Sternschanze and arrested the leaders of the Hells Angels of Hamburg. In 1986, thirteen members were sentenced between 6 months to 7 years in prison for crimes including brothel-keeping and extortion, and the Hamburg charter and its symbols were banned. Despite the ban, today there is again a Hells Angels charter in Hamburg under the name of "Harbor City", because the association is not prohibited as such, but only wearing its symbols. The club itself could not be designated a criminal organization due to insufficient evidence.

The other Hells Angels members and 250 of 497 members of the motorcycle club "Bones" in Hannover under its President Frank Hanebuth, took over the power in the Hamburg Kiez and controlled numerous brothels, including the "Laufhaus" and the "Pascha", on the Reeperbahn. Some women were forced into prostitution with brutal violence. At the height of its power in the middle of 2000, the monthly brothel sales amounted to €150,000 (DM300,000). After a leading member of the Hells Angels, Norbert "Butcher" S., 34, had beaten up a 42-year-old woman, waitress, prostitute, cocaine addict and drug courier, who tried to burn herself to death, she pointed him out to the police and disappeared. Meanwhile, Butcher fled to Brazil because the Hells Angels had set a bounty on him. German investigators tracked him to South America and persuaded him to give evidence. On November 1, 2000, 400 police officers moved to a major raid and arrested the new leadership of the association. In Germany, Sweden and Poland 17 suspects were arrested and more than 50 kilograms of narcotics were seized. The witnesses are now living under police protection because they fear for their lives.

2000s 
Helmut "Miko" M., a leading figure of the Karlsruhe Hells Angels, a 42-year-old brothel owner and notorious red-light figure in Karlsruhe, was shot dead in January 2004 in a coffee shop downtown in broad daylight. Previously, in December 2003, a bomb attack perpetrated on him failed due to an intermittent contact in the explosive device. The background to the crime was disputes over open money claims in the red-light district.

In March 2006, a group of Hells Angels raided a Bandidos clubhouse in Stuhr where they assaulted and robbed five Bandidos members. Three were given jail sentences and another eleven were handed down suspended sentences at the trial which took place in Hannover on December 16, 2008.

On May 27, 2007, five Hells Angels members attacked, robbed and injured one Bandidos member in Hohenschönhausen, Berlin. Nineteen police vehicles were in use and shots were fired. A witness filmed the scene. All people involved including the Hells Angels, Bandidos and the witness were silent in court. Sources say there are two high ranking Hells Angels members involved in the conflict. One is the former President of the "Hells Angels of Berlin" and the other was a high ranking "Road Captain" who is now the "Treasurer" of the "Hells Angels of Berlin."

On June 11, 2008, Heino B., 48 and Thomas K., 36, two Bandidos members were convicted and sentenced to life imprisonment for the murder of the Hells Angels member Robert K. in Ibbenbüren. Reports say they drove to his Harley-Davidson shop and shot him there on May 23, 2007. After the first day of a related lawsuit on December 17, 2007, riots between the two gangs and the police were reported. Robert K. was 47-years old and "Road Captain" of the Bremen Hells Angels but lived in the area of Osnabrück, where their rivals Bandidos claim supremacy.

Also in June 2008, eight Hells Angels members of the "Hells Angels West Side" and one unidentified biker, who is not a Hells Angels member, were arrested on the A27 near Walsrode. Five private apartments and the clubhouse "Angels Place" in Bremen were searched. Police reports say the LKA-Bremen seized firearms, baseball bats, knives and illegal drugs. Later on the day the BKA (Bundeskriminalamt) arrested another Hells Angels member. Police reports also say five Hells Angels members are on the run.

On July 17, 2008, 34 persons of a group of 50 were arrested in Oranienburg street in Berlin-Mitte. Sources say the persons are supporters of the Hells Angels and bouncers and hooligans in the Mecklenburg-Vorpommern scene. Other sources say the persons are members of the "Brigade 81", a murderous group of the Hells Angels. One of the hooligans (now ex-hooligan and vice-president of the Potsdam Hells Angels) was a famous and dangerous fighter, who had beaten the French police officer Daniel Nivel into a coma in 1998. The police seized white masks, knuckle dusters, telescopic batons, quartz-sand-gloves and illegal drugs. The background of the incident was that a group of Bandidos appeared in the "Gold Club" and wanted to play power games. "It's about the staking of areas and the protection of illegal sources of income", a police statement said.

Later in 2008, Bandidos members attacked a Hells Angels member in Berlin and shots were fired at a Hells Angels member in Cottbus. In Kiel, a mass brawl occurred between members of the Hells Angels and alleged right-wing extremists. During the brutal conflict a Hells Angels member and tattooist from Neumünster was seriously injured with a knife.

On December 6, 2008, the front man of the Hells Angels "Nomads", was brutally beaten in the nightclub "Omega" in Eberswalde. The perpetrators were members of the Chicanos, a support group of the Bandidos motorcycle gang.

In February 2009, the Hells Angels published a statement about the mass brawl in Kiel, distancing itself from contacts to the right-wing scene. "The Hells Angels MC was, is and remains a non-politically motivated club" and "new members have to leave the right-wing scene", Frank Hanebuth, president of the Hannover Hells Angels, said in the statement. The attempt to draw the club into the right-wing haze is a personal insult for every member, the Hells Angels indicate. "We have eight different nations in our club. One comes from Israel, one from Palestine, one even from Suriname. And we are xenophobic?", he asked.

In August 2009, a leading member of the Berlin Bandidos was stabbed and shot to death in Hohenschönhausen, Berlin. A news channel claimed, the 33-year-old Michael B., was a well known outlaw motorcyclist in the district of Lichtenberg, Berlin, the President of the Berlin chapter of the Bandidos MC, and former member of the Hells Angels. Police reports say there is a continuing war over territorial claims between the Bandidos and the Hells Angels.

In October 2009, at the opening ceremony of a new Hells Angels pub in Potsdam, 70 police officers controlled 159 persons, 39 vehicles and arrested one member, who was a fugitive belonging to the Hells Angels group "Nomads." The man was wanted for violation of the Arms Act. Two baseball bats and a banned one-handed knife were also found.

Since December 22, 2009, two members of the Hells Angels stood trial in Kaiserslautern. They were accused, along with another Hells Angels member, who was previously a fugitive, of having allegedly murdered the 45-year-old President of the Donnersberg Outlaws MC in June 2009.

Also in December 2009, a 38-year-old member of the Hells Angels was stabbed and critically injured in Erfurt. Shortly after the attack, the police arrested four suspects in Weimar, including two members of the Jena Bandidos.

2010s 
In January 2010, the President of the Flensburg Hells Angels was arrested, accused of attempted homicide and hit-and-run driving, by having hit a Bandidos member with his car on the A7, reports say. On the same day, police raided the homes of two other Hells Angels members. Investigators searched for additional evidence in connection with the discovery of a weapons depot in a car repair shop in Flensburg. In November 2009, police had discovered explosives, five machine guns, ten shotguns and pump guns, revolvers and pistols and lots of ammunition.

In February 2010 in Potsdam, about 70 supporters of the Berlin chapter of the Bandidos MC, who usually are hostile to the Hells Angels, moved to the Berlin chapter of the Hells Angels. Police reports say the background of this step is unknown. Specialists say it could have something to do with a fight on June 21, 2009, in Finowfurt where one motorcyclist's leg was badly injured with an axe and the President of the "Brigade 81", André S., was stabbed in the back. Other sources say it could have something to do with the immigrant background of the Berlin chapter of the Bandidos.  In general, it was claimed that the outlaw motorcyclists were nationalistic and felt they were "real German men", therefore members with Turkish roots were not welcome. A leading Hells Angels member confirmed the defection and said the new members will be part of "Hells Angels Turkey."

On March 15, 2010, a 21-year-old supporter of the Bandidos was stabbed and badly injured in Kiel. In the same night, police raided meeting points of the Hells Angels. A few days earlier, shots were fired at the house of the local Hells Angels leader.

On March 17, 2010, a Bonn Hells Angels member shot dead a 42-year-old police officer of the SEK (Spezialeinsatzkommando) during a house search. He was subsequently acquitted of murder charges by the German Supreme court, stating that he acted in self-defense after murder threats by Bandido members.

Since March 2010, a Hells Angels member has been standing trial in Duisburg for having murdered an Oberhausen Bandidos member in Hochfeld, Duisburg on October 8, 2009, who was executed with a headshot in its red-light district.

In April 2010, a member of the Flensburg Hells Angels, who is a witness in a double murder case and a businessman are accused having extorted €380,000 from another businessman who, after a dispute with his wife, stabbed her and his 7-year-old daughter to death then set his house on fire in February 2009. The background to the crimes were caused by economic difficulties.

On May 3, 2012, the Cologne chapter of the Hells Angels MC was forcefully disbanded and all property of the chapter was confiscated by the North Rhine-Westphalia ministry of home affairs. On the same morning the North Rhine-Westphalian Police raided and searched 32 homes of its members. No arrests were made, however the public display of chapter symbols and the wearing of its regalia were banned. The support club Red Devils MC Cologne was also banned. The North Rhine-Westphalian interior minister justified these actions by saying "The Hells Angels intentionally ignore the basic values of our society. They close themselves off from society, set up their own rules and practice vigilante justice". The previous week similar action was taken against the nearby Aachen chapter of the Bandidos M.C.

On May 29, 2012, the Berlin City Chapter of Hells Angels MC was disbanded and a raid was started. Allegations of an information leak inside the Berlin ministry of home affairs about the upcoming measures were made.

Eight members of the Hells Angels' Berlin charter, including the chapter president Kadir Padir, were sentenced to life in prison by a Berlin court in 2019 for the murder of Tahrir Özbek, a rival gangster with whom Padir was in a long-running conflict. On 10 January 2014, a group of thirteen Hells Angels stormed a Berlin bookmaker's shop, with one of them shooting Özbek six times. One other Hells Angels member was handed a shortened prison sentence of twelve years after he cooperated with investigators.

In early October 2016, Giessen Chapter boss Aygun Mucuk was shot dead at the chapter clubhouse, reportedly the result of a rivalry between the Giessen Hells Angels, whose membership is largely of Turkish origin, and the long-established Hells Angels chapter in nearby Frankfurt. Hundreds of Hells Angels members gathered to ride in honor at his funeral.

Netherlands
The first Hells Angels chapter in the Netherland was formed in 1978 when the Kreidler Ploeg Oost biker club in Amsterdam was "patched over". The Hells Angels control much of the drug trade in the Netherlands, and are also involved in prostitution. The Dutch police have stated that the Hells Angels smuggle cocaine into the country through terrorist organizations and drug cartels in Curaçao and Colombia, and also deal in ecstasy and illegal firearms.

Hells Angels member Louis Hagemann, who had over a hundred previous convictions including armed robbery, rape and attempted murder, was convicted of the 1984 murder of a mother and her two daughters in February 2003. After strangling Corina Bolhaar, he stabbed nine-year-old Donna and six-year-old Sharon. Hagemann was cleared of murdering Northern Irish woman Joanne Wilson in Amsterdam in 1985 due to insufficient evidence.

Dutch Hells Angels allegedly murdered Stephen "Grumps" Cunningham, a senior member of the club's Nomads chapter in England, who disappeared after boarding a ferry from Ramsgate to Ostend, Belgium on 9 September 1997. Cunningham reportedly travelled to the Netherlands to make a down payment to the Amsterdam Hells Angels on a consignment of cannabis that would be shipped to the United Kingdom. After making the payment, Cunningham was allegedly killed by the Amsterdam chapter under contract from the English Nomads, with whom he had been involved in a dispute for several months. His body was reportedly disposed of at the bottom of a canal.

In October 2005, the Dutch police raided Hells Angels' clubhouses in Amsterdam, Haarlem, IJmuiden, Harlingen, Kampen and Rotterdam as well as a number of houses. Belgian police also raided two locations over the border. Police seized a grenade launcher, a flame thrower, hand grenades, 20 hand guns, a machine pistol and €70,000 (US$103,285) in cash. A number of Hells Angels members were later imprisoned on charges of international trafficking of cocaine and ecstasy, the production and distribution of marijuana, money laundering and murder, after an investigation that lasted over a year.

In 2006 two Dutch newspapers reported that the Amsterdam brothel Yab Yum had long been controlled by the Dutch Hells Angels, who had taken over after a campaign of threats and blackmailing. The city council of Amsterdam revoked the license of Yab Yum in December 2007. During a subsequent trial the city's attorney repeated these allegations and the brothel's attorney denied them. The brothel was closed in January 2008.

Twenty-three bikers were arrested following a fight between Hells Angels and Mongols, in which several gunshots were fired and one person wounded, at the Van der Valk hotel in Rotterdam on April 7, 2016.

On May 29, 2019, the Hells Angels were banned in the Netherlands. This is the first country in the world to outlaw the entire club. The presiding judge of the court in Utrecht called it "a danger to public order and the rule of law".

New Zealand
The Hells Angels' first international chapter was opened in Auckland on 1 July 1961. The Hells Angels are the most influential organised crime group in New Zealand and are involved in the manufacture and distribution of methamphetamine, allegedly acquiring Chinese-imported pseudoephedrine (a chemical precursor in the illicit manufacture of methamphetamine) from triad groups. New Zealand's Hells Angels are allied with the Head Hunters.

In June 1971, members of the Hells Angels, Highway 61, the Mongrel Mob and the Polynesian Panthers were involved in a large-scale brawl in Auckland, which resulted in numerous arrests.

Seven Hells Angels received prison sentences of up to ten years for their part in the murder of Bradley Earl Haora, a nineteen-year-old Highway 61 member killed with a shotgun in Mount Eden on December 29, 1975.

Hells Angels sergeant-at-arms Andrew Sisson was convicted in 1993 of importing $200,000 of methamphetamine hidden inside a vehicle transmission. In 1999, Sisson and his wife, Vikki Thorne-George, were convicted of money laundering and conspiracy to supply methamphetamine.

The Hells Angels "patched over" the Lost Breed in Nelson in 2016 and the Mothers MC in Palmerston North in 2018, and also opened chapters in South Auckland and Christchurch.

Norway
Due to the extent of the criminal activities of HAMC in Norway, Kripos, the criminal investigation unit of the Norwegian police, considers the Hells Angels Motorcycle Club to be a criminal organisation.

In 2011 the presumed leader of HAMC Norway Leif Ivar Kristiansen was convicted of threats, robbery and severe drug crimes, and sentenced to four years and nine months in prison. In another case he was found guilty of fencing and tax evasion, and a number of smaller charges. According to numbers from Kripos in 2012, 120 Hells Angels-members have been convicted 400 times for about 1000 violations of the Norwegian penal code. The convictions include violence, rape, severe drug criminality and threats.

In 2010, 2011 and 2013 the police conducted raids on the HAMC headquarters in Oslo and confiscated a number of illegal weapons in all the raids. The police demanded in October 2013 that the headquarters be seized as they believe the house is being used as a staging ground for organized criminal activities.

Portugal
In 2018 Portuguese authorities publicly declared that they found strong evidence of potential gang violence events against Bandidos, a rival motorcycle club, specifically against Mário Machado, once the leader of the Portuguese Hammerskins, who is suspected to be a member of the latter. Around 80 search warrants and dozens of arrest arrests were issued.

In July 2019, Portuguese prosecutors charged 89 members of Hells Angels with involvement in organized crime, attempted murder, robbery, drug trafficking, qualified extortion and possession of illegal weapons and ammunition.

Romania
In November 2020, Romanian Hells Angels national president Marius Lazăr was arrested along with New Zealand nationals Michael Matthews Murray and Marc Patrick Johnson on cocaine trafficking charges following an investigation by the Directorate for Investigating Organized Crime and Terrorism (DIICOT) at the request of the United States Department of Justice. The investigation determined that a cocaine shipment from the United States had been ordered by the leader of the New Zealand Hells Angels and that club members had travelled to Bucharest to arrange the details of the transport. Two luxury cars, 12 motorcycles, US$200,000 in cash, a "lethal weapon", and 100 grams of cocaine were seized during raids carried out in Bucharest and Ilfov County by Romanian organized crime prosecutors in partnership with the U.S. Drug Enforcement Administration (DEA) and Department of Homeland Security. In January 2023, Romania approved an extradition request to have Lazăr transferred to the U.S. to stand trial on charges of drug trafficking, money laundering and complicity in attempted murder. He allegedly negotiated the attempted killing of two rivals. Lazăr was met by the U.S. Marshals Service as he boarded a plane to the United States on 16 January 2023.

South Africa
The first HAMC chapter in South Africa was founded in Johannesburg on 14 August 1993. Other charters were subsequently formed in the West Rand on 31 January 1994, Durban on 6 September 1997, and Cape Town on 13 June 1998. The Hells Angels became associated with the Johannesburg "bouncer mafia", a criminal network involved in narcotics trafficking and extortion in the city's nightclub industry that emerged in the late apartheid era. The Hells Angels introduced methamphetamine to South Africa around 1997 when the club began manufacturing the drug on a mass-scale by capitalising on the ease with which ephedrine could be obtained in the country.<ref>[https://globalinitiative.net/wp-content/uploads/2016/07/Organised-Crime-in-Late-Apartheid-and-the-Transition-to-a-New-Criminal-Order-The-Rise-and-Fall-of-the-Johannesburg-Bouncer-Mafia.pdf  Organised Crime in Late Apartheid and the Transition to a New Criminal Order: The Rise and Fall of the Johannesburg 'Bouncer Mafia'''] Mark Shaw and Simone, Journal of Southern African Studies (30 June 2016)</ref> Criminal links between the South African Hells Angels, particularly the chapters connected to the security industry in Gauteng, and their American counterparts were strengthened after South Africa hosted the club's annual "World Run" international motorcycle rally in 1999.

Violent incidents
In early 1994, Hells Angels member Lucky Sylaides was arrested by police detectives after firing an unlicensed Uzi submachine gun into the air outside his tattoo parlour in Durban's central business district. Sylaides was arrested and charged with the prohibited possession of a machine gun, a charge that carries a five-year minimum prison sentence. Sylaides and the weapon were released into the custody of Piet Meyer, the head of the Durban police's organised crime unit, who claimed that Sylaides was a police agent. Charges against Sylaides were dismissed and the gun was never recovered. In 1999, Meyer was charged with defeating the ends of justice and other crimes after an investigation revealed that Sylaides was neither an agent nor an informer as Meyer had claimed. Meyer was sentenced to ten years in prison in December 2002 after being convicted of corruption, theft and making a false statement.

On 8 November 2002, a Hells Angels member was shot dead at a café in Oakdene, allegedly by crime figures Nigel McGurk and Mikey Schultz, former members of the club. The biker was fatally shot in the chest after approaching two men and drawing an unlicensed firearm. Police recovered two revolvers and two pistols at the scene. McGurk and Schultz were arrested and taken into custody at a Booysens police station on suspicion of the murder before being released. The pair were later granted immunity from prosecution for a series of murders, including that of mining magnate Brett Kebble, in exchange for testifying against drug smuggler Glenn Agliotti.

HAMC member Edward Jacobs was beaten with a baseball bat and robbed of watches and approximately R100,000 in cash by bouncer Gary Beuthin, his girlfriend Melanie van Niekerk and nightclub owner Warren Schertel after responding to an adult classified advertisement in Sandton, Johannesburg on November 17, 2007. Beuthin, van Niekerk and Schertel were charged with attempted murder, armed robbery with aggravating circumstances, kidnapping, and possession of firearms and ammunition. On 10 February 2010, Beuthin was sentenced to seven years in prison after pleading guilty to some of the charges, while van Niekerk and Schertel were acquitted on all charges.

A Hells Angel was fatally shot and another wounded after four club members arrived at a motorcycle repair shop in Amanzimtoti and became involved in an altercation with the shop owner on 11 March 2020. The two other bikers fled the scene. Police subsequently arrested the owner and opened a murder/attempted murder investigation. Hells Angels members had previously assaulted an employee during a visit to the shop on 29 January.

Drug trafficking
Andre Vogel, a hitman who pleaded guilty to the contract killing of bouncer Billy van Vuuren, testified in October 1999 that the Hells Angels were connected to a drug syndicate that hired him for the murder and that he was paid in cash afterwards directly by Kevin Brown, the club's Johannesburg chapter president. Brown also provided Vogel with a false passport, and another Hells Angel, Lucky Sylaides, provided him with ammunition. Van Vuuren was fatally shot 32 times with a fully-automatic sniper rifle outside a Johannesburg nightclub on 14 February 1997 after setting up competition to the syndicate. Others implicated by Vogel, who was sentenced to 32 years in prison, included nightclub owners and members of the Durban police's organised crime unit.

An international drug smuggling ring involving Hells Angels in South Africa and the United States was allegedly established in November 1999 and uncovered by the U.S. Drug Enforcement Administration (DEA) in 2001. Methamphetamine, hidden in stuffed toys, was speed-mailed from South Africa to Flagstaff, Arizona, from where it was distributed to other U.S. states. South Africans Peter Conway, vice-president of the Hells Angels Nomads chapter, and Michael "Jethro" Hall, former president, and a number of American members were charged with the smuggling. American Hells Angel Greg Surdukan pleaded guilty to charges and was sentenced to fifteen years in prison by a Phoenix judge in June 2002. The U.S. authorities had less success prosecuting the South Africans; Hall was shot dead during a burglary at his Johannesburg home in May 2002, and Conway emigrated to the United Kingdom before he could face charges, where he died on 24 November 2018, aged 52.

Four members of the HAMC were arrested in Johannesburg on 8 November 2002 and charged with various crimes following an intelligence operation by the South African Police Service (SAPS) organised crime unit. Three of the bikers were arrested in Sandton on narcotics and firearms charges for allegedly operating a clandestine drug laboratory. The other was apprehended near Bedfordview after he was allegedly found in possession of three superbikes that were suspected to have been stolen. Police also seized an unlicensed shotgun, rifle, handguns, a silencer, a large quantity of unlicensed ammunition, methcathinone, dagga, cocaine, MDMA tablets and various chemicals and equipment used in the manufacture of methcathinone. Those arrested included the club's Johannesburg chapter president, Edward Jacobs.

Members of the Hells Angels in Gauteng – including Peter Conway, a senior member until he left the club in 2009 – were implicated after police raids on illegal drug laboratories in 2005 and 2009. Charges against Conway relating to an investigation from 2005, when he was arrested on two occasions for allegedly selling MDMA tablets, were withdrawn at Meyerton Magistrate's Court on 31 August 2009.

Hells Angels member Alexander Bely, a former Soviet citizen who immigrated to South Africa in the late 1980s, was arrested in 2006 before being extradited to Russia in February 2013, alleged to have organised the delivery of 224 kilograms of ephedrine to the country between 2003 and 2005 and laundering over ₽34.5 million (around $1.2 million). Bely, along with Andrei Bykov and Bykov's spouse, cousin, adopted daughter and her husband, allegedly obtained the drug from the Hells Angels in South Africa and delivered it to St. Petersburg, passing it off as bath salts. In May 2005, Bykov's wife fled to South Africa, seeking to avoid criminal prosecution. The group then began delivering ephedrine under the guise of detergent. In 2008, three accomplices of Bykov and Bely were found guilty and sentenced to prison terms. Andrei Bykov and his wife Yevgenia were extradited to Russia in 2009 and received fourteen- and eighteen-year sentences, respectively.

Spain
Spanish police carried out a number of raids against the club on April 21, 2009, arresting 22 members in Barcelona, Valencia, Málaga, Madrid and Las Palmas. Two of them were members of the club's Italian chapters. The Hells Angels arrested were charged with drugs and weapons trafficking, and extortion. Law enforcement seized military-style weapons and ammunition, bulletproof vests, a kilo of cocaine, neo-Nazi literature and €200,000 in cash during the searches of 30 properties. One suspect also attempted to use a firearm against police officers as he was being arrested. It was part of an investigation into the club, known as Valkiria, which began in October 2007 and also led to eight arrests in December 2007. Prior to this, the only operation against the club in Spain took place in March 1996.

On October 12, 2011, a club owned by the Hells Angels in Barcelona, The Other Place, was attacked by anti-fascists while a Nazi concert organized by the far-right party Democracia Nacional was held there.

Nine members of the Spanish Charter were involved, among other crimes, in the killing of a notary in Torrevieja and sentenced to 67 years in prison.

Sweden
Sweden is home to twelve Hells Angels chapters with 170 members and 230 official supporters. In 2012, the Swedish television network TV4 compiled a report which alleged that the Hells Angels had been convicted of 2,800 crimes in the country, including 420 violent crimes.

Thailand
Since 2012, Thailand has hosted Hells Angels nomads – members not affiliated with any particular regional chapter. A Pattaya chapter was founded in April 2016. It was reported in 2017 that the club has fourteen fully patched members in the country – five Australians, four Germans, a Canadian and four Thais.

Australian Hells Angels member Luke Joshua Cook and his Thai wife Kanyarat Wedphitak were sentenced to death in November 2018 after being found guilty of attempting to smuggle half a ton of methamphetamine from China into Thailand on board a yacht in June 2015. Thai authorities have stated that Cook, a member of the Pattaya chapter with links to Hells Angels in Sydney, was paid $10 million (฿320 million) by the club to smuggle the drugs for later shipment to Australia.

Wayne Schneider, a high-ranking Australian member of the Hells Angels in Thailand, was abducted at gunpoint outside his villa in Pattaya on November 30, 2015, and taken to a flat where he was tied to a chair and beaten to death by five other Hells Angels. His body was found the following day. Antonio Bagnato, another Australian who hired four fellow Hells Angels to help him kill Schneider over a drug network dispute, was convicted of murder and sentenced to death in February 2017. Tyler Gerard, an American, was sentenced to three years in prison, which was reduced to two years after he assisted in the investigation, for his role in the killing, while Australian Luke Cook was convicted of aiding and abetting by driving Bagnato and his family to the Cambodian border in an attempt to escape justice. Schneider had left Australia for Thailand in 2012 after police linked him to two drug laboratories discovered in southwest Sydney. Bagnato also fled the country after the 2014 murder of Sydney man Bradley Dillon for which he is a suspect.

Turkey
On July 30, 2010, the European police agency Europol issued a warning on an increase of Hells Angels and Bandidos activities in Southeast Europe and Turkey. The newly founded Hells Angels Turkey denied the warning's content, calling the relevant report "utter nonsense" and alleging Europol officials are after more European Union funds. On July 2, 2011, around 20 Hells Angels Turkey members in Kadıköy, Istanbul attacked people in a bar and injured seven of them (two severely) pleading that these people were drinking alcohol on the street and disturbing the neighbourhood. It had been earlier reported that Turkish defectors from Bandidos Germany chapter have joined the ranks of Hells Angels Turkey.

United Kingdom
Members of the San Francisco Hells Angels chapter were invited by the Beatles to visit England in 1968, and in May 1969, one of the first English Hells Angels chapter presidents, Peter "Buttons" Welsh, began "prospecting" for the San Francisco Hells Angels. On 30 July 1969, the first two HAMC charters in Europe were issued; the East London chapter was sanctioned by the San Francisco Hells Angels and the South London chapter was sponsored by the Hells Angels in Oakland. Both London chapters merged in 1973. By 1995, the club's United Kingdom faction consisted of twelve chapters and an estimated 250 members. According to the National Criminal Intelligence Service (NCIS), the British Hells Angels are involved in cannabis and amphetamine trafficking, as well as contract killing, extortion, prostitution, money laundering and credit card fraud. The NCIS called the Hells Angels "the fastest-growing organised crime group in the world" also accused the club of being responsible for more assaults and murders than any other gang in the country.

England
The HAMC has established seventeen chapters in England, with membership based primarily around the London, Manchester, Liverpool, Essex, Kent, Sussex and Tyne and Wear areas.

Violent incidents
Three Hells Angels were jailed in Colchester for threatening behaviour likely to cause a breach of the peace in the aftermath of the August 1971 Weeley Festival, at which 39 club members fought with stall holders. Hells Angels' motorcycles were vandalised and a number of bikers needed medical treatment, some for severe injuries, after the Hells Angels destroyed catering equipment using iron bars.

On 1 November 1972, three Hells Angels were sentenced to prison for their part in the rape of a fourteen-year-old girl who was seized from the street and sexually assaulted in front of laughing teenagers in a local café during a national Hells Angels convention in Winchester. Ian "Moose" Everest was convicted of raping the girl and sentenced to seven years, while Stephen "Boots" Ripley and Anthony "Chas" Mann were each given four years for aiding and abetting Everest. In sentencing the trio, judge Sir George Waller said: "We have heard of the Hells Angels as an utterly evil organisation which is vile and corrosive of young people. But I do not sentence you for being members of the Hells Angels. No doubt the evil nature of that organisation has led you into this situation".

Hells Angels member David Richards and his girlfriend were sentenced to a minimum of sixteen years' imprisonment in December 1984 for the murder of 16-year-old Michael Groves, who suffered 56 injuries in an attack with a hammer, a knife and a wrench at the couple's flat in West London. After serving 21 years of his sentence, and months before his scheduled release, Richards absconded from the open prison at HM Prison Sudbury in May 2006, fleeing to Ireland, where he was jailed for three months for robbery without his status as a fugitive in the UK coming to the attention of Irish authorities. He subsequently returned to England, settling in Wolverhampton. On 6 June 2014, Richards was apprehended at his home in Penn after the Metropolitan Police received a tip-off regarding his whereabouts, and he was sentenced to two-and-a-years in prison on 1 September 2014 after pleading guilty to escaping from custody.

On 2 April 1987, Rita Parminter, a sex worker known as "Apricot Lil", was sexually assaulted and strangled to death by former Hells Angels member Leonard Tedham in Hastings. Tedham was sentenced to life in prison for the murder in 1988.

In January 2019, Matthew Barnes, president of the Sussex chapter of the Hells Angels, was formally cleared of allegedly assaulting Christopher "Swaggers" Harrison. Harrison alleged that he had been assaulted by Barnes and other Hells Angels members after refusing to join the club when he was found unconscious and with his eyes ruptured outside a pub in Hastings in February 2016. Barnes' co-defendant Oliver Wilkinson was also acquitted following a trial in August 2018.

A Hells Angels member allegedly assaulted a toilet attendant after being caught using cocaine in a pub in Maidstone on 18 May 2019. A group of six men believed to be Hells Angels were in the pub that night.

49 people were arrested on suspicion of drug offences and possession of offensive weapons during a three-day event held to mark the 50th anniversary of the Hells Angels founding in the UK which took place in Surrey and Sussex from 30 May to 1 June 2019 and culminated in a mass ride of around 100 motorcyclists from Pease Pottage to Brighton. The majority of those arrested were either cautioned or released without charge; of the twelve people charged – five Germans, three Hungarians, one Swiss, one French, one Czech and one Greek man – at least seven were given suspended prison sentences. 27 international members of the Hells Angels were also prevented from entering to UK to attend the event due to previous convictions.

Members of the Hells Angels' Sunderland-based Tyne and Wear chapter took part in counter protests against a Black Lives Matter demonstration near Grey's Monument in Newcastle upon Tyne in June 2020. Disorder and fighting between the two groups resulted in police officers, dogs and horses, as well as member of the public, being injured, and 38 people were charged with violent disorder. In May 2022, Hells Angels members Christopher Butters and Colin Green, the Tyne and Wear chapter president, were sentenced to 31 and 29 months' imprisonment, respectively. Club prospect Matthew Chapman was also sentenced to 30 months'. Green died at HM Prison Northumberland on 24 May 2022.

On 22 August 2020, a car was driven through the wall of the Hells Angels' Manchester chapter clubhouse in Cadishead.

Conflicts
In the late 1960s and early 1970s, a number of homegrown British outlaw biker clubs, in reaction to the international publicity of the Hells Angels in the United States, began adopting the club's name, red-on-white colour scheme or a variation of the "death's head" insignia. A number of these unsanctioned clubs from the South and West of England amalgamated and were invited to join the official "All England chapter" of the Hells Angels. An unchartered club in Windsor was refused permission to join the "All England chapter" but continued to wear identical replicas of the Hells Angels' "colours". On 15 April 1979, a group of up to thirty Hells Angels armed with guns, axes and knives ambushed fifteen members of the rogue Windsor Hells Angels who were sleeping in a car park near Brockenhurst. Five Windsor bikers were injured, while the rest escaped into the New Forest countryside. Richard Sharman, the leader of the Windsor chapter, survived being shot three times in the head, Richard Jessop suffered a fractured skull, and another man received a shotgun wound to the buttocks. 24 Hells Angels members were convicted for the attack and were imprisoned or given suspended sentences in 1980. The Windsor chapter officially became Hells Angels in 1985 shortly after its only black member, John Mikkelsen, had died. Black men are not permitted to join the club and Mikkelsen's membership was a significant factor in the Windsor chapter failing to be sanctioned earlier. Mikkelsen died in police custody after being arrested in Bedfont on suspicion of car theft on 15 July 1985. He was clubbed over the head by a policeman in order to force him to release a stranglehold on another officer and subsequently choked to death on his own vomit. Seven police officers, including a chief inspector, were suspended from duty after an inquest jury in West London coroner's court ruled on 27 March 1986 that Mikkelsen had been unlawfully killed. On 15 December 1986, the seven policemen began a successful appeal in the High Court of Justice to challenge the verdict, claiming that the jury's finding was not "supported by the evidence". The application to quash the initial jury verdict was opposed by coroner John Burton and the family and friends of Mikkelsen. The verdict was subsequently changed to manslaughter.

Another unsanctioned motorcycle gang using the club's name was the Hells Angels Vikings, formed in Surrey in 1969. The Hells Angels Vikings were "in a constant state of war" with the official Hells Angels chapter in London and renamed as the Vikings in 1975. The Vikings, who continued using a "death's head" logo similar to the Hells Angels', refused an invitation to join the Angels' "All England chapter" in 1980. Hells Angels member David Wyeth, along with an accomplice, carried out an assault and attempted to steal the "colours" of a Vikings member in Maidstone on 7 May 2018. The victim suffered a fractured vertebrate. Wyeth pleaded guilty to affray and was given a twelve-week prison sentence in August 2019. Seven prospective members of the Hells Angels' Slough chapter and the affiliated Red Devils – Przemyslaw Korkus, Jimi Kidd, Bartosz Plesniak, Piotr Zamijewski, Ladislav Szalay, Tamas Tomacsek and David Jacobs – were convicted of multiple offences and each sentenced to fourteen years in prison in October 2019 for an attack on six members of the Vikings and their support group the Wargs Brotherhood who were meeting at the Wargs' clubhouse in Blindley Heath on 7 November 2018. A total of thirteen men are believed to have been involved in the attack, using knives, baseball bats and other weapons, which left the six rival bikers wounded; several suffered head injuries, all except one were stabbed, and one was disemboweled. The conflict between the groups allegedly began when the Hells Angels sought to open a chapter in Surrey and tried to entice the Wargs into switching their allegiance from the Vikings to the Hells Angels. When it became clear that the Vikings would resist any attempt to persuade the Wargs to leave them, the Hells Angels decided to launch the attack.

Members of the Hells Angels' Lea Valley chapter took part in a mass brawl against a group from the Luton Town MIGs hooligan firm at the Blockers Arms public house in Luton in May 1990. The MIGs gained the upper hand, forcing the bikers from the pub. With further violence seeming inevitable, undercover police officers were assigned to observe key figures on both sides. However, the MIGs decided to pay the Hells Angels £2,000 in compensation rather than face the continued threat of retaliation.

The Hells Angels' English Nomads chapter was formed on 25 February 1989. The Nomads chapter became involved in a turf war with the Southampton chapter of the Satans Slaves, which began after Hells Angels members Stephen Harris and Barry Burn were fired upon during a trip to Bristol. Nomads chapter president Harris was wounded in the arm while Burn escaped injury. Another Hells Angel, David McKenzie, was stabbed eight times after being attacked outside a pub in Gloucester months later. In April 1991, Stephen "Grumps" Cunningham, a leading member of the Nomads chapter and major amphetamine and cannabis dealer, lost his right hand when a car bomb targeting a Satans Slave biker exploded prematurely in Southampton. The Satans Slaves member targeted by Cunningham was the leader of a rival drug enterprise. Cunningham sported a new patch, consisting of two Nazi-style SS lightning bolts below the words "Filthy Few", after he recovered from attempting to set the bomb. According to the book Gangs: A Journey into the Heart of the British Underworld by Tony Thompson (a crime correspondent for The Observer), the "Filthy Few" patch is awarded only to those who have committed or are prepared to commit murder on the club's behalf.

The Wolverhampton Hells Angels chapter became involved in a longrunning dispute with the Derby-based Road Tramps motorcycle gang over control of the "Rock and Blues Custom show", a lucrative annual motorcycle festival which the Road Tramps founded in 1983. A few weeks before the opening of the July 1992 edition of the event, the Derbyshire Constabulary received intelligence indicating that the Hells Angels planned to attack rival bikers at the show and police subsequently forbade the Road Tramps from allowing any Angels to attend. The Wolverhampton Hells Angels were simultaneously involved in a feud with the Cycle Tramps biker gang of Birmingham, which resulted in dozens of assaults, numerous stabbings and shootings, and several mass armed brawls in the early 1990s. A man from Wolverhampton was charged with attempted murder after three Cycle Tramps members were shot and wounded when their car was fired on by a passing vehicle in April 1992. Prior to the 1992 "Rock and Blues Custom show", the Cycle Tramps and the Road Tramps merged with five other bikers clubs — the multi-chapter Ratae, the Pagans of Leamington Spa, the Stafford Eagles, the Road Runners and Leicester's Pariahs — to form a collation against the Hells Angels. The various gangs united to become the Midlands Outlaws, whose "colours" consisted of a skull wearing Native American headdress featuring seven different coloured feathers, with each colour representing one of the founding clubs. In August 1992, a former Cycle Tramps member survived being shot with a sawn-off shotgun through the letter box on the front door of his home. At the Hells Angels' annual Bulldog Bash in Long Marston two weeks later, two Angels kidnapped, tortured and interrogated a member of an independent motorcycle gang who was friendly with members of the Midlands Outlaws, forcing him into revealing information about the reasons behind the Outlaws' formation and future plans. The Midlands Outlaws later began "prospecting" for the American Outlaws Association — the Hells Angels' biggest rival internationally — and "patched over" to join the A.O.A. in February 2000.

During the late 1990s, the Hells Angels waged a two-year war against the Outcasts biker gang, which was centred in London and East Anglia. The two clubs had historically coexisted without violence; police theorized that the Hells Angels' attempts to nullify the Outcasts started after they were warned by the club's American leadership to combat the rise of rival motorcycle gangs or have their charter revoked. Another theory is that the clubs were engaged in a conflict over control of London drug and prostitution rackets. The dispute began when the Outcasts tried to absorb a small Hertfordshire club, the Lost Tribe, in June 1997. Concerned that such a move would make the Outcasts their equal in numbers, the Hells Angels themselves then laid claim to the Lost Tribe. 22 Outcasts members defected to the Hells Angels when the Angels began coercing Outcasts into "patching over". In November 1997, two members of the Outcasts were arrested in possession of loaded shotguns, allegedly on their way to confront the Angels. On 31 January 1998, Outcasts members David "Flipper" Armstrong and Malcolm "Terminator" St Clair were killed after being ambushed by members of the Essex Hells Angels chapter, known as the "Hatchet Crew", at the "Rockers Reunion" concert at the Battersea Arts Centre in Battersea, south London. Armstrong was dragged from his motorcycle and hacked to death with axes and knives; St Clair raced to his aid but was stabbed eight times. A third Outcast, David "Diddy" Traherne, and an Outcast-turned-Angel, Barry Hollingsworth, were also injured in the attack, which was co-ordinated using microphone headsets. Acting under orders from the leaders of the Hells Angels' 14 chapters nationwide, approximately 40 members armed with pickaxe handles, hammers, machetes, knives, iron bars and axes were present at the annual "Rockers Reunion", which was traditionally attended by the Outcasts. Outcasts members also provided security at the event. The Metropolitan Police launched Operation Middlezoy, an investigation into the incident, which resulted in Hells Angels bikers Hollingsworth, Ronald "Gut" Wait and Raymond Woodward being charged with murder. Charges against Hollingsworth and Woodward were withdrawn after two protected witnesses in the case, an Outcast and his wife, refused to give evidence due to the police invertedly revealing their names to the solicitor for the defence. Hollingsworth and Woodward, who were Hells Angels "prospects" at the time of the attack, were subsequently rewarded with full membership. Essex chapter vice-president Wait was convicted of conspiring to cause grievous bodily harm and sentenced to fifteen years imprisonment at the Old Bailey on 23 November 1998. The murder charge against him was dismissed by prosecutors when the jury failed to reach a verdict. The 18st (114 kg) Wait, who suffered from angina and diabetes, died in prison of a heart attack in 2001. Outcasts sergeant-at-arms Richard "Stitch" Anderton was arrested with a .45 caliber Smith & Wesson revolver in his waistband after police detectives stopped him in his car in Poole in June 1998. A subsequent search of his home by the National Crime Squad (NCS) uncovered additional weapons including an Uzi submachine gun, an AK-47 assault rifle and a rocket launcher as well as hundreds of shotgun cartridges, thousands of 9 mm rounds, amphetamines, cannabis and ecstasy. Police believed the arsenal was intended to be used in the Outcasts' war against the Hells Angels. Following his arrest, Anderton, a former Angels "prospect", claimed that he had moved from Essex to Dorset and armed himself after learning that he was listed on a Hells Angels "death list" of Outcasts who were to be "killed on site". He was imprisoned for three years in June 1999. In March 1999, a fertilizer and petrol bomb was found at the clubhouse of the Hells Angels' Lea Valley chapter in Luton, and there was an attempted arson attack on a motorcycle shop owned by Angels biker Ian "Maz" Harris in Kent. Two Outcasts were then shot close to their Bow, east London clubhouse in June 1999. Both survived but refused to co-operate with police. The Outcasts disbanded as a result of the conflict, aligning themselves with the Midlands Outlaws and joining the February 2000 "patch over" to the American Outlaws Association.

The Outlaws, who have around 150 British members across fourteen chapters mainly based in the West Midlands, have since become the Hells Angels' main rivals in the UK since opening chapters in the country. On 12 August 2001, a Canadian Hells Angels member was shot three times in the leg and wounded after shots were fired from a dark-coloured saloon car on the M40 motorway as he left the Bulldog Bash, held at the Shakespeare County Raceway in Long Marston. He refused to make a statement to the police and the shooting went unsolved. In an identical incident on 12 August 2007, Hells Angels member Gerry Tobin was shot dead as he rode his motorcycle home to London, where he worked as a Harley-Davidson service manager, from the Bulldog Bash. Two bullets were fired from a Rover car which drove up alongside him as he sped down the M40 motorway, one hitting him in the head. Seven members of the Outlaws, the entire South Warwickshire chapter, were convicted over his murder and sentenced to a total of 191 years in prison. It is believed that Tobin was killed due to the fact that the Hells Angels-run Bulldog Bash is held in Outlaws territory, and that the killing may have been sanctioned by Outlaws leadership in the United States. A brawl between up to thirty Hells Angels and Outlaws members took place at Birmingham International Airport on 20 January 2008 after the two groups had found themselves together on a flight from Alicante, Spain, with police recovering various weapons including knuckledusters, hammers, a machete and a meat cleaver. Three Hells Angels and four Outlaws were convicted as a result.

Drug trafficking
The Hells Angels became involved in a dispute between a Dutch drug trafficker and a Liverpool crime family in late 1992. The Liverpudlian gang had made a significant down payment on a large shipment of cannabis from Amsterdam which was seized by British customs officials during a routine check of a Dutch-registered ship docking at Manchester. Under the terms of the agreement, the drugs were no longer the responsibility of the Dutchman once they had left Dutch waters but the Liverpool family refused to pay the £140,000 owed and so the trafficker, a former Hells Angel, contracted the club to collect the debt owed to him. Three Hells Angels – Wolverhampton chapter vice-president Michael "Long Mick" Rowledge, Andrew Trevis, also from Wolverhampton, and Windsor chapter member Stephen Pollock – travelled to Aintree on 7 October 1992 and agreed to meet the Liverpudlians outside a supermarket in the Old Roan area. While the Hells Angels waited in their car, a gunman approached and shot Rowledge four times in the chest, killing him, before escaping in a waiting vehicle. In 1993, Delroy Davies was acquitted after a trial at Liverpool Crown Court and Thomas Dures was jailed for thirteen years for conspiracy to murder.

Pierre Rodrigue and David Rouleau, two Canadian Hells Angels from the Sherbrooke chapter, were arrested by British police in London at the request of the Royal Canadian Mounted Police (RCMP) in February 1995 before being extradited to Canada and sentenced to fourteen years' imprisonment for conspiring to smuggle 558 kilograms of cocaine into the UK in a scheme also involving the Rizzuto crime family and the Cali Cartel.

Arms trafficking
Hells Angels member Dennis Taskin was jailed for six years and nine months after admitting illegally possessing ammunition and five guns as well as cocaine, amphetamines and morphine. Police had found an Uzi, three revolvers and an antique pistol as well as dum-dum bullets and drugs when they raided a flat rented by Taskin in Hove on 26 December 2009.

Stuart Manners, a member of the Hells Angels' Cadishead chapter, was jailed for twelve years after being convicted of selling a Smith & Wesson 9mm handgun and 21 bullets to Liverpool criminal Darren Alcock and his associate Paul Estridge in Stockport in August 2012. Alcock and Estridge were both sentenced to 14 years.

Wales
The first Welsh Hells Angels chapter was formed in October 1999. The Hells Angels' West Wales chapter clubhouse in Haverfordwest was raided by police in September 2007, with the police finding a handgun fitted with a silencer loaded with a full magazine of bullets. Gary Young, a probationary club member, was charged with possessing the weapon; he denied the charge and was found not guilty. He was later granted a conditional discharge for two years after admitting possessing a firearm without a certificate, possessing an offensive weapon and possessing three amounts of cannabis, charges which stemmed from several further police raids on his home during the initial investigation. Young was expelled from the Hells Angels due to the club taking exception to him "naming names" about who was whom within the West Wales chapter.

Neil Lake needed three metal plates inserted in his face after being attacked by a Hells Angel at a petrol station in Cardiff in October 2007. Lake took down the registration of his attacker's Harley-Davidson motorcycle which led police to Sean Timmins, the vice-president of the Wolverhampton chapter. Timmins denied inflicting grievous bodily harm on Lake and claimed that a fellow club member had been riding around with the same number plates as him; he told a judge he knew the identity of the actual attacker but explained that it would be against club rules for him to name him. Timmins was cleared of the charge in September 2008 after providing an alibi who said that he was working in his hometown on the day of the attack. He would later be one of the three Hells Angels jailed for six years after the brawl with the Outlaws at Birmingham Airport.

Hells Angels members Stephen Jones and Raymond Scaddan were cleared of violent behavior, while former member Andrew McCann was also found not guilty of violent disorder but convicted of using threatening, abusive, insulting words or behavior at Newport Crown Court on 1 November 2015. Jones and Scaddan maintained that they went to McCann's home in Newport on 24 January 2015 to collect money for a £2,000 gold necklace that had been given to him and that they had acted in self-defence after an alleged attack by McCann and his son. McCann, who left the club in 2014 after a dispute, claimed the two Hells Angels had come to extort £5,000 from him.

United States

The HAMC is designated an outlaw motorcycle gang by the Department of Justice. There are an estimated 92 Hells Angels chapters in 27 U.S. states, with a membership of over 800. Due to the club's designation as a "known criminal organization" by the State Department and Department of Homeland Security, the United States has a federal policy prohibiting its foreign members from entering the country. The Hells Angels partake in drug trafficking, gunrunning, extortion, money laundering, insurance fraud, kidnapping, robbery, theft, counterfeiting, contraband smuggling, loan sharking, prostitution, trafficking in stolen goods, motorcycle and motorcycle parts theft, assault, murder, bombings, arson, intimidation and contract killing. The club's role in the narcotics trade involves the production, transportation and distribution of marijuana and methamphetamine, in addition to the transportation and distribution of cocaine, hashish, heroin, LSD, MDMA, PCP and diverted pharmaceuticals. According to the Federal Bureau of Investigation (FBI), the HAMC may earn up to $1 billion in drug sales annually.

The Hells Angels are allied with numerous smaller motorcycle gangs – such as the Galloping Goose, the Hessians, the Iron Horsemen, the Red Devils, the Sons of Silence and the Warlocks – and have associated in criminal ventures with the Bufalino, Cleveland, Gambino, Genovese and Patriarca crime families, as well as the Aryan Brotherhood, the Mexican Mafia, and the Nazi Lowriders. Rival motorcycle gangs include the Bandidos, the Breed, the Mongols, the Outlaws, the Pagans, the Sons of Satan and the Vagos.

See also
 Bandidos MC criminal allegations and incidents

References

Bibliography
 
 
 
Langton, Jerry Fallen Angel: The Unlikely Rise of Walter Stadnick and the Canadian Hells Angels Toronto: John Wiley & Sons, 2006, .
Langton, Jerry Showdown: How the Outlaws, Hells Angels and Cops Fought for Control of the Streets, Toronto: John Wiley & Sons, 2010, .
Sher, Julian & Marsden, William The Road To Hell How the Biker Gangs Are Conquering Canada, Toronto: Alfred Knopf, 2003, 
Schnedier, Stephen Iced: The Story of Organized Crime in Canada'', Toronto: John Wiley & Sons, 2009,

External links
Official Hells Angels website – listing many chartered local chapters, with links

FBI file on Hell's Angels

Criminal allegations and incidents
Transnational organized crime
Organized crime groups in Argentina
Organised crime groups in Belgium
Organised crime groups in Denmark
Organised crime groups in England
Organised crime groups in Germany
Organised crime groups in the Netherlands
Organised crime groups in New Zealand
Organised crime groups in Norway
Organized crime groups in Portugal
Organized crime groups in Romania
Organised crime groups in South Africa
Organised crime groups in Spain
Organized crime groups in Sweden
Organised crime groups in Thailand
Organized crime groups in Turkey
Organised crime groups in Wales